Fleur Nagengast (born 28 January 1998) is a Dutch former professional racing cyclist, who competed in cyclo-cross for Telenet–Fidea, and in road racing for UCI Women's Continental Team .

References

External links

1998 births
Living people
Dutch female cyclists
Place of birth missing (living people)
People from Midden-Drenthe
Cyclists from Drenthe
21st-century Dutch women